Ecem Çırpan (born 10 July 1996) is a Turkish volleyball player, model and beauty pageant titleholder born and raised in Bursa, Turkey. She was crowned Miss Turkey 2015 and represented her country at the Miss World 2015 pageant.

Life and career
Born and raised in Bursa, Turkey she currently resides in Istanbul, Turkey where she works as a model.

Pageantry

Miss Turkey 2015
Ecem won Miss Turkey 2015 and was crowned as Miss World Turkey. She represented her country in Miss World 2015 in Sanya, China but did not place.

References

External links
Miss Turkey official website

1996 births
Living people
Miss World 2015 delegates
People from Bursa
Turkish beauty pageant winners
Turkish female models
Turkish women's volleyball players